Wanda J. Sharp (born July 23, 1950) is an American politician.

Born in Chicago, Illinois, Sharp worked as a supervisor, safety trainer, and coordinator for Ford Motor Company. Sharp is an African-American. She served on the board of trustees for the village of Maywood, Illinois and was involved with the Democratic Party. On January 29, 1999, Sharp was appointed to the Illinois House of Representatives and served until 2001.

Notes

1950 births
Living people
Politicians from Chicago
People from Maywood, Illinois
Ford people
Women state legislators in Illinois
Illinois city council members
Democratic Party members of the Illinois House of Representatives
African-American state legislators in Illinois
Women city councillors in Illinois
African-American city council members in Illinois